GBF may refer to:

 Bilfinger, a German firm, stock symbol
 G.B.F. (film), 2013, US
 Gaikundi language, native to Papua New Guinea
 Gain before feedback
 Gay best friend
 Georgian Basketball Federation
 Graduate Business Forum, US
 Grassroots Business Fund, US